The Thousand Islands Playhouse is a summer theatre company located in Gananoque, Ontario, Canada.

It was founded in 1981 by Greg Wanless and a group of local actors and graduates from Queen's University including Timm Hughes, Joan Gardiner, Mo Bock, and Kathryn Mackay. Artistic Director Wanless and Assistant Artistic Director  Mackay retired at the end of the 2012 season. The current Artistic Director is Brett Christopher, and the Associate Artistic Director is Sophia Fabiilli.

Thousand Islands Playhouse operates two theatres, the former Gananoque Canoe Club building as the 348-seat Springer Theatre in which musicals and larger plays are performed, and a black-box theatre, the 140-seat Firehall Theatre in which smaller, experimental plays are produced.

The Thousand Islands Playhouse's programming also includes a Playwrights’ Unit with workshop productions for the public, a touring show performed by their Young Company, and the Studio ‘S’ Classical Music Series. The company has also recently renovated a new premier production facility.

Playwrights’ Unit

The Playwrights’ Unit is a year-long residency program to nurture promising playwrights. The selected writers create new plays while having the Playhouse audience and resources of both the Springer Theatre and Firehall Theatre in mind. During the month of December, the Playhouse holds full day workshops during the PlayReading series; a series of free-public reading on the playwrights’ work.

2015 Playwrights’ Unit

Bed and Breakfast was written in the 2014 Playwrights’ Unit and is being presented in the company’s 2015 season. It is about two men who escape the big city life and move to a small town in Ontario seeking to call it home.

Young Company

Beginning in mid-April until the end of June, The Young Company introduces children to the magic of theatre with a travelling show, incorporating reading, singing, storytelling and dance. The Young Company has been bringing high-calibre acting to the Thousand Islands Playhouse since 1997, performing their shows across Eastern Ontario to school-aged children, as well as in parks, libraries, and at special events. They employ a troupe of young professionals providing them with professionally led-workshops and master classes.  The graduates have gone on to take well-earned places in the profession.

Studio ‘S’ Music Series

Throughout the summer on select Monday evenings, the Thousand Islands Playhouse presents the popular Studio ‘S’ series, an intimate concert and conversation series with world-renowned classical musicians, hosted by Eric Friesen. Each season features four new performers in the intimate 348 seat Springer Theatre.

Production Facility

In May 2014, the Thousand Islands Playhouse began to renovate a 10,395 square foot warehouse into Eastern Ontario’s premier production facility.  The facility allows plenty of room to build and store many things such as sets, costumes, props and a space for the actors to rehearse plays and musicals. This project was incorporated with a sprung floor, sound proofed rooms and rack systems for the Playhouse’s inventory of props and costumes that finished on March 31, 2015.

References

External links
Official Site of The Thousand Islands Playhouse

Theatre companies in Ontario
Thousand Islands
1982 establishments in Ontario